Vareš is a town and municipality located in Zenica-Doboj Canton of the Federation of Bosnia and Herzegovina, an entity of Bosnia and Herzegovina. It is situated in central Bosnia and Herzegovina, and is famous for the local mining activities and production of iron. As of 2013, it has a population of 8,892 inhabitants, with 2,917 in the town itself.

Geography
Vareš is a mountainous town located 45 km from Sarajevo in the valley of the small Stavnja River 828 m above sea level surrounded by the massive high Kapija, Stijene, Zvijezda and Perun Mountains, named after Perun / Перун, the highest god of the Slavic pantheon (Perkūnas/Perkons). The town is rich with archeological findings from different epochs – on several surrounding locations are found remains of prehistorical period, such as copper artifacts in Brgula.

In the town center itself, there is an old stone bridge that resembles to the majority of one arched bridges from Ottoman period. This bridge is considered to be similar by the building method to the Old Bridge in Mostar.

History

Early history
The town of Vareš has a long history with remains of metallurgical activities dating back to Bronze Age. Also during the Roman era, the town was famous for its miners and smiths.

Middle ages
During Middle Ages the Bosnian kings had their center in close proximity of the modern city of Vareš. Bosnia's greatest king, Tvrtko, considered the Vareš' village Duboštica for the center of his kingdom, since it was the mining center of his country.

Medieval
The remains of the medieval royal city and castle Bobovac were recently proclaimed as national monuments, as was the Catholic Church of St. Michael in the town of Vareš. Oldest preserved Catholic church in Bosnia can be found in the town, built in early 17th century.
The town was earlier dominated by Catholic population. The church books are among the oldest preserved in Bosnia and date back to 1643.

Austro-Hungarian Empire
During the Austrian rule of Bosnia and Herzegovina the iron-works of Vareš were an important exporter of various iron products to the rest of the Habsburg empire. In 1891, the first blast furnace in Bosnia and Herzegovina was built there. That blast furnace still exists, but it ceased its operations in 1990.

World War I
In the 1910s World War I, men of the town were subject to draft, and served in the regiment BH-1, formally based in Sarajevo. They mostly saw action in the Italian and Galician fronts. The church bell was taken and melted so it could be used to produce war material.

World War II
During World War II, following the invasion and occupation of Yugoslavia, Vareš was incorporated into the fascist puppet Independent State of Croatia (NDH), and controlled by the Croatian Ustashe quislings, as an important mining center whose natural resources, mainly iron ore, was exploited to support the NDH war efforts. In April 1945, the town was eventually liberated by the Yugoslav Partisans, and became a part of the Socialist Federal Republic of Yugoslavia.

Bosnian War (1992–95)
In April 1992, the Bosnian War began and lasted until December 1995. The town of Vareš had 12,000 residents at the time, with Croats being small majority. Since the first democratic elections in 1991 until October 1993, the municipality was governed by the Social Democratic Party of Bosnia and Herzegovina, non-ethnic party, while the town's and municipality territory was under joint the Croatian Defence Council (HVO) and the Army of the Republic of Bosnia and Herzegovina (ARBiH) control since the war begun. Despite the outbreak of the Croat-Bosniak War, the relations between the local HVO and the ARBiH units remained relatively good until the summer of 1993. As a consequence of broader conflict deepening between Croats and Bosniak, especially in Central Bosnia, the ARBiH overran the HVO in nearby Kakanj resulting in few thousands of Croat refugees settling in Vareš. In October, the local HVO, supported by HDZ and structures of Herceg-Bosna, took full control of the town, while most of the Bosniak population has been forced to leave or fled. On 23 October, dozens of Bosniaks were killed by the HVO in the Stupni Do massacre. Following the massacre, ARBiH attacked the Vareš enclave and captured the town in early November. Most of the Croat and some Serb population fled through the Serb lines to Kiseljak and Kreševo, while the town was looted after its capture. The remaining HVO units took hold in the village of Daštansko, where they remained until the Dayton Agreement was signed in November 1995.

Many Croat, most of Bosniaks and аn insignificant number of Serbs have returned to Vareš in 1995, but the majority emigrated to United States, Canada, Australia and other West European countries. Many Croats from Vareš ended up in Croatia while Serbs fled to Republika Srpska and Serbia.

Demographics
According to the 2013 census results, it has a population 8,892 inhabitants. Population decline is evident since the end of the Bosnian War, as nearly two thirds of the population from 1991 left Vareš in only twenty years.

Ethnic composition

Settlements
Aside from the town of Vareš, the municipality includes the following settlements:

 Bijelo Borje
 Blaža
 Borovica Donja
 Borovica Gornja
 Borovičke Njive
 Brda* Brezik
 Brgule
 Budoželje
 Čamovine
 Ćeće
 Dabravine
 Daštansko
 Debela Međa
 Diknjići
 Dragovići
 Draževići
 Duboštica
 Hodžići
 Ivančevo
 Javornik
 Kadarići
 Karići
 Kokoščići
 Kolovići
 Kopališta
 Kopijari
 Krčevine
 Kunosići
 Letevci
 Ligatići
 Luke
 Ljepovići
 Mijakovići
 Mir
 Mižnović
 Mlakve
 Naseoci
 Neprivaj
 Oćevija
 Okruglica
 Orah
 Osoje
 Osredak
 Ostrlja
 Pajtov Han
 Pajtovići
 Planinica
 Pobilje
 Podjavor
 Pogar
 Položac
 Poljanice
 Pomenići
 Pržići
 Pržići Kolonija
 Radonjići
 Radoševići
 Ravne
 Rokoč
 Samari
 Semizova Ponikva
 Seoci
 Sjenokos
 Slavin
 Sršljenci
 Strica
 Striježevo
 Stupni Do
 Šikulje
 Tisovci
 Toljenak
 Tribija
 Vareš Majdan
 Vijaka Donja
 Vijaka Gornja
 Višnjići
 Zabrezje
 Zaruđe
 Zubeta
 Zvijezda,
 Žalja i Žižci

Tourism
The Vareš region also has possibilities for winter tourism development. Due to its position and elevation snow stays longer than in other regions, and the beautiful areas surrounding it are really good for skiing and skating. The mountain resort Doli is located on Zvijezda Mountain.

List of mayors
 Ivica Džoja 1954–1963; League of Communists of Yugoslavia
 Mile Markić 1963–197x; League of Communists of Yugoslavia
 Slobodan Milanović 197x–197x; League of Communists of Yugoslavia
 Salko Operta 1974–1978; League of Communists of Yugoslavia
 Rešad Žutić 1981–1983; League of Communists of Yugoslavia
 Željko Franjkić 1986–1988; League of Communists of Yugoslavia
 Pero Jarčević 1988–1989; League of Communists of Yugoslavia
 Mladen Zovko 1989–1990; League of Communists of Yugoslavia
 Dario Andrijević 1990–1992; KPJ - SDP BiH
 Anto Pejčinović 1992–1993 HDZ BiH 
 Mervana Hadžimurtezić 1992–1998 SDA
 Samir Musa 1998–2000 SDA (joint mayor)
 Pavao Vidović 1998–2000 HDZ BiH (joint major)
 Ermin Musa 2000–2001 SDA
 Hamdo Fatić 2001–2012 SDP BiH
 Avdija Kovačević 2012–2016 SDA
 Zdravko Marošević 2016–present HDZ BiH

Notable people
 Borislav Stjepanović, actor
 Ipe Ivandić, musician
 Milo Cipra, music composer
 Slaven Stjepanović, footballer
 Željko Ivanković, poet and writer
 Matija Divković, Bosnian Franciscan writer
 fra Grgo Ilić - Varešanin (1736-1813), Franciscan friar and bishop, served as provincial minister and apostolic vicar
 Grigorije Durić

References

External links

 http://www.vares.pp.se/
 http://www.vares-x.com.ba/
  Web magazine with current information on the city - in Croatian
 http://www.zupavares.com/
 http://www.vares.info/
 Tragovima bosanskog kraljevstva  - Tourist route for medieval Bosnia
 Trail of the Bosnian Kingdom - Cultural Tourism in Vares

Cities and towns in the Federation of Bosnia and Herzegovina
Populated places in Vareš
Municipalities of Zenica-Doboj Canton